Pierre Lake may refer to:

Pierre Lake (Ontario)
Pierre Lake (Washington)